This is a list of extant tramway and light rail systems in the United Kingdom. For a full historical list of all tramway systems that have existed in the country, see List of town tramway systems in the United Kingdom.

Operating systems

Systems under construction
Coventry Very Light Rail  The Coventry Very Light Rail is a planned system of four lines around the city of Coventry. The first line to University Hospital Coventry is planned to open late 2023, or early 2024. The first tram vehicle left the construction line in late March 2021, and was taken on a showcase in the city, before being taken to Dudley for testing.

South Wales Metro  Four light rapid transit lines are opening in the Welsh Capital of Cardiff as part of the current "Metro" plan Phase 1 in 2023, which will reach as far out of the capital as Hirwaun, a town  from Cardiff Bay, as well as three new lines planned to open by 2026.

Proposed systems
KenEx Tram - Thames crossing between Kent and Essex
Wirral Street Car
Bristol underground metro
 HERT (Hertfordshire and Essex Rapid Transit)

Cancelled systems
Bristol Supertram
CITI Belfast
Cross River Tram
East London Transit - built as bus rapid transit
Leeds Supertram
Merseytram
Penistone Line Tram-Train
South Hampshire Rapid Transit
Thames Gateway Transit
West London Tram
Tees Valley Metro

See also
 Light Rail Transit Association
 List of guided busways and BRT systems in the United Kingdom
 List of town tramway systems in the United Kingdom
 List of trolleybus systems in the United Kingdom
 Rapid transit in the United Kingdom
 Urban rail in the United Kingdom

References

 List in England
England
Tramways in England
England transport-related lists